This list of Vogue India cover models is a catalog of cover models who have appeared on the cover of Vogue India, the Indian edition of Vogue magazine, starting with the magazine's first issue in October 2007.

2000s

2007

2008

2009

2010s

2010

2011

2012

2013

2014

2015

2016

2017

2018

2019

2020s

2020

2021

2022

2022 

India
Vogue India
Vogue India
Vogue India cover models
Vogue
Indian fashion